Harris Michael Brewis (born 19 September 1992), better known as Hbomberguy, is a British YouTuber and Twitch streamer. Brewis produces video essays on a variety of topics such as film, television, and video games, often combining them with arguments from left-wing political and economic positions. He also creates videos aimed at debunking conspiracy theories and responding to right-wing and antifeminist arguments.

Content
Brewis started the Hbomberguy YouTube channel on 28 May 2006. As of 30 March 2022, the channel has over 1,000,000 subscribers. Brewis' presentation techniques include hand-drawn animation and humour to make his points. His videos also deal with topics related to politics and social justice, including analyses of alt-right arguments and themes. Brewis has built upon his "measured response" style to form what has become a series of close readings of cultural figures such as flat Earth conspiracy theorists, pickup artists, anti-vaxxers, and content creators who believe soy makes men feminine and use the term soy boy. In a statement to The Telegraph, Brewis said that while many creators on YouTube take advantage of how "you can basically say whatever you want without consequences," he instead takes a more careful approach, consulting experts on the relevant topic of a video prior to publication in order to ensure its factual accuracy.

Along with his political analysis and measured response series, Brewis has been producing long-form media reviews and video essays on a number of topics, such as television, film, internet culture and video games.

In July 2020, Brewis released a video criticizing the American web series RWBY. Prior to its release, Brewis attempted to upload the video and found it automatically blocked by YouTube's Content ID system. Brewis opted to extensively re-edit the video to circumvent such automated detection and hire a lawyer to review the content in order to ensure it complied with fair use prior to publication. In an essay criticizing the Content ID system, the Electronic Frontier Foundation highlighted Brewis' difficulty as an example of how they believed Content ID "undermines" the intent of fair use.

Brewis also uploads his videos on Nebula, with some exclusive and extended cut videos on the service.

Mermaids charity stream

From 18 to 21 January 2019, Brewis continually streamed an attempt to complete Donkey Kong 64 to raise money for British transgender charity organization Mermaids, which he completed in 57 hours and 48 minutes. The charity had been designated funding by the British National Lottery, but the funding was withheld and put under review after criticism by comedy writer and anti-transgender activist Graham Linehan and others. This inspired Brewis to livestream in support of the charity.

The livestream featured many notable guests, including U.S. Representative Alexandria Ocasio-Cortez; activist and whistleblower Chelsea Manning; actress Mara Wilson; journalists Paris Lees and Owen Jones; Adam Ruins Everything creator Adam Conover; author Chuck Tingle; Matt Christman and Virgil Texas of the Chapo Trap House podcast; Donkey Kong 64 composer Grant Kirkhope; game designers Rebecca Heineman, Josh Sawyer, John Romero and Scott Benson; YouTubers Natalie Wynn, Lindsay Ellis, Abigail Thorn and Jim Stephanie Sterling; as well as the CEO of Mermaids, Susie Green. Colin Mochrie, Neil Gaiman, Cher, Matthew Mercer, Adam Savage, Hidetaka Suehiro and SonicFox also tweeted in support of the livestream and the charity. In the first 24 hours, the livestream raised over $100,000. In total, over $347,000 was raised for the charity through the livestream, with over 659,000 people watching the stream.

The livestream garnered attention and praise. It was described by The Guardian as "an antidote to the worst of gaming culture" and praised in a motion lodged in the Scottish Parliament by Green Party co-convenor Patrick Harvie. In July 2019, the LGBT magazine Attitude recognized the livestream by honoring Brewis with an Attitude Pride Award. Mermaids also thanked Brewis for the livestream on their Twitter account.

Reception
Brewis has been praised by critics for his YouTube channel's format and commentary. His video analysis of the Ctrl+Alt+Del comic "Loss" has received critical acclaim: it was selected by Polygon as one of the ten best video essays of 2018 and was nominated three times in the Sight & Sound collection of 2018's most outstanding videographic criticism, with British film critic and filmmaker Charlie Lyne stating: "The reliably great H. Bomberguy pushed the YouTube video essay into new territory with this Matryoshka doll of an upload: a layered critique of the gaming webcomic Ctrl+Alt+Del, Tommy Wiseau’s bad-taste classic The Room and the YouTube video essay itself. To cap it all off, it’s a horror movie". His video on VHS, which was produced in collaboration with Shannon Strucci, was praised by TenEighty Magazine as an excellent "deep-dive" in the topic.

Personal life 
Brewis is bisexual, and an atheist.

See also 

 BreadTube
 ContraPoints
 Philosophy Tube
 Shaun
 Innuendo Studios

References

External links

, a secondary channel for livestreams.
Hbomberguy's Twitch on Twitch.tv

Living people
Year of birth uncertain
Bisexual feminists
Bisexual men
English anti-fascists
English bisexual people
English-language YouTube channels
English political commentators
English social commentators
English socialist feminists
English YouTubers
Labour Party (UK) people
LGBT feminists
English LGBT people
English LGBT rights activists
LGBT YouTubers
Male feminists
Patreon creators
Transgender rights activists
Twitch (service) streamers
Video essayists
English atheists
YouTube critics and reviewers
Alumni of Aberystwyth University
People from West Yorkshire
Year of birth missing (living people)